Lance Taylor, known as OG Boo Dirty, is an American rapper from Memphis, Tennessee.

Taylor was arrested in December 2010 after a brawl in Memphis and charged with attempted second-degree murder, inciting to riot and aggravated riot.  In August 2013, he was again arrested and charged with several felonies after police in Memphis found drugs, a loaded handgun and more than $3,400 in cash in a vehicle containing Taylor and three other men.

Discography

Album 
 Billionaire Dreams (2016)

Mixtapes 
 Almost Famous (Hosted By DJ Scream) (2010)
 The Story of OG (2011)
 Born a Soulja, Die a Vet (2012)
 Definition of a G (2012)
 Definition of a G 2 (2013)
 Street Certified (2015)
 Allah (2018)

References 

Living people
1017 Brick Squad artists
Rappers from Memphis, Tennessee
Southern hip hop musicians
21st-century American rappers
Year of birth missing (living people)
African-American male rappers
21st-century American male musicians
21st-century African-American musicians